Out of the Park Developments GmbH & Co.KG is a German video game developer based in Hollern-Twielenfleth. Founded by Markus Heinsohn and Andreas Raht in 1999, the studio specialises in text sim-style sports games, and as produced notable franchises, such as Out of the Park Baseball and Franchise Hockey Manager.

History 

Out of the Park Developments was founded in 1999, by current managing directors Markus Heinsohn and Andreas Raht.

On 21 December 2016, Out of the Park Developments announced that they had received Metacritic's 2016 PC Game of the Year Award for Out of the Park Baseball 17.

On October 12, 2020, Com2uS acquired a 100% stake in Out of the Park Developments.

Games developed

References

External links 
 

Video game development companies
Video game companies of Germany